Multivisión, styled as multivisión, is the fifth national network of Cuba, established in 2008 and operated by the ICRT. Its programming primarily consists of imports from other countries.

History
The channel began broadcasting in 2008 from the five national telecentros, or regional production centers, at hours in which no local programs were being broadcast. However, this forced changes to other stations' schedules, and in the summer of 2009, Multivisión moved to its own TV channels.

Programming
Multivisión's programming includes a mix of telenovelas, series, documentaries (chiefly from National Geographic Channel and DW-TV), music videos and imported children's programs, as well as movies on Sunday nights and American primetime shows in the evenings.

Television channels and stations established in 2008
Television in Cuba